Love Jam is the second album by Ai Otsuka, released on 17 November 2004 under the Avex Trax record label. This album was available in CD and CD+DVD editions. The first-press of the CD Only edition came with an 80-page illustration book drawn by Ai Otsuka herself (limited to 200,000 copies).  The album hit #30 in 2005, selling 414,513 copies.  In total, the album has sold about 656,708 copies.

The CD+DVD edition (with a different cover) came with a DVD containing the animated version of Daisuki da yo's PV, which featured Otsuka's LOVE characters. The DVD also included a short film starring Otsuka involving the Kingyo Hanabi track.

Track listing

Charts and certifications

Charts

Certifications

 Total Sales: 656,708 (Japan)

References

External links
 

2004 albums
Ai Otsuka albums
Avex Group albums